The 82d Training Wing, sometimes written as 82nd Training Wing, (82 TRW) is a United States Air Force unit assigned to the Air Education and Training Command, Second Air Force. It is stationed at Sheppard Air Force Base, Texas where it is also the host unit.

The 82nd Training Wing produces more than 62,000 graduates annually in more than 1,000 technical training courses. The primary training includes aircraft maintenance, civil engineering, nuclear and conventional munitions, aerospace ground equipment, avionics, electricians and plumbers and telecommunications training conducted by the four assigned training groups.

The unit's history goes back to the 82nd Fighter Group, which was a Twelfth and Fifteenth Air Force combat unit that fought in North Africa and Italy during World War II.  During the early years of the Cold War, the 82nd Fighter Wing was a Strategic Air Command fighter escort and tactical fighter unit.

The commander of the 82nd Training Wing is Brigadier General Lyle K Drew. The Command Chief Master Sergeant is Chief Master Sergeant John P. Chilcote.

Units
The 82 TRW is the largest of four technical training wings in Air Education and Training Command and is diversified in scope of training. The 82nd, 782nd, and 982nd Training Groups conduct training at Sheppard and at geographically separated locations around the country. The 982nd Training Group conducts training at locations worldwide.

82d Training Group (82 TRG)
The 82nd Training Group is responsible for aircraft maintenance and armament and munitions including nuclear munitions. The 82d Training Group provides aircraft maintenance and munitions training to satisfy the full range of customer requirements for respective apportioned United States Air Force specialties, including officer and enlisted initial skills courses in 17 different Air Force Specialty Codes, advanced and supplemental courses, the Maintenance Course for Operational Commanders, and the Mission Generation Road Course.
 359th Training Squadron (359 TRS)
 361st Training Squadron (361 TRS)
 362nd Training Squadron (362 TRS)
 363rd Training Squadron (363 TRS)

782nd Training Group (782 TRG)
 The 782d Training Group is the most diverse group in Air Education and Training Command, with courses in seven distinctly different career fields in four training squadrons. The 782d Training Group is also responsible for a diverse set of training to include aircraft systems and telecommunications, avionics test equipment, combat avionics, flight line training and explosive ordnance disposal. They are also responsible for electrical, fuels and mechanical training. Detachments 1, 3, and 6 are responsible for media production and interactive courseware. 
364th Training Squadron
365th Training Squadron 
366th Training Squadron 
367th Training Support Squadron (Hill AFB, UT)
368th Training Squadron (Fort Leonard Wood, MO)

982d Training Group (982 TRG)
 The 982d Training Group provides quality hands-on aircraft, munitions and communications-electronics maintenance training to meet the evolving needs of its primary customer, the first-line supervisor. The 982d Training Group has more than 1,200 people assigned within two training squadrons and one maintenance squadron. The 982d Training Group provides weapon systems training at 44 detachments and operating locations worldwide. Exercising single-point training management, the group is the Air Education and Training Command's first point of contact for many weapons systems. In this capacity, the 982d develops comprehensive training programs and provides technical support for design and development of training equipment during acquisition and modification of aircraft and associated equipment. The vision of the 982nd Training Group is to provide field training and training support that makes a lasting difference.
 372nd Training Squadron (372 TRS)
 373rd Training Squadron (373 TRS)
 982nd Maintenance Squadron (982 MXS)
82nd Mission Support Group (82 MSG)
 The 82nd Mission Support Group provides security, personnel support, food services, communications, contracting services, logistics, supplies, vehicle maintenance, housing, lodging, facility maintenance and emergency services for Sheppard's two wings and 17 tenants composed of more than 5,900 military, civilian and contractor personnel, 81,900 joint trainees annually and 9,200 dependents and retirees.
 82d Communications Squadron (82 CS)
 82d Security Forces Squadron (82 SFS)
 82d Force Support Squadron (82 FSS)
 82d Civil Engineer Squadron (82 CES)
 82d Logistics Readiness Squadron (82 LRS)
 82d Contracting Squadron (82 CONS)

82d Medical Group (82 MDG)
 The 82nd Medical Group provides comprehensive health services for 20,000 beneficiaries for the Sheppard military community and surrounding referral areas. Large numbers of group personnel are ready to deploy in response to any contingency worldwide. Additionally, the 82nd Medical Group provides aerospace and physiology services for the NATO alliance and Department of Defense instructors and their families in the Euro-NATO Joint Jet Pilot Training Program. 
 82d Medical Operations Squadron (82 MDOS)
 82d Dental Squadron (82 DS)
 82d Aerospace Medical Squadron (82 AMDS)
 82d Medical Support Squadron (82 MDSS)

Additionally, the 82nd Comptroller Squadron (82 CPTS) reports directly to the 82 TRW.

History
The wing's history started with the 82nd Fighter Group, which fought in Europe during World War II.

Cold War
The 82nd was established as a Strategic Air Command fighter wing on 28 July 1947 at Grenier Field, New Hampshire. The 82nd Fighter Wing was established in accordance with the Hobson Plan which established a controlling wing at each Air Force Base that commanding all groups and support units on the facility.  However, the Air Force did not organize (assign personnel) to the wing until 15 August 1947. The wing was attached to the 307th Bomb Wing from 15 August 1947 to 15 December 1948. On 16 December 1948 the wing was reassigned to Fifteenth Air Force.

The operational flying component of the wing was the 82nd Fighter Group, composed of the 95th, 96th and 97th Fighter Squadrons and were equipped with Lockheed P-38 Lightning aircraft.  Most officers that arrived were rated pilots that had recently returned to military life. Many had World War II combat experience. Many officers and enlisted men arrived at Grenier from 62nd Fighter Squadron, a unit that had just returned from a winter test in Alaska.

The wing was relieved of its responsibilities to the Fifteenth Air Force on 22 August 1949 and was inactivated on 20 October 1949.

Air Training Command

The 82nd replaced and absorbed resources of the 3525th Pilot Training Wing in February 1973 at Williams Air Force Base, Arizona and assumed undergraduate pilot training operations in Cessna T-37 Tweet and Northrop T-38 Talon aircraft. Assigned to the wing were the 96th and 97th Flying Training Squadrons.

On 19 September 1976, the first women entered undergraduate pilot training. Ten female students were in Class 77-08. First Lieutenant Christine E. Schott became the first woman to solo in the T-38. On 2 September 1977, Class 77-08 graduated. The ten women received their wings along with 36 male classmates. In March 1978, the 82nd's first female instructor pilot, Capt Connie Engel, was assigned to the 97th Fighter Training Squadron to instruct T-38 students.

Air Training Command activated the 98th and the 99th Flying Training Squadrons on 1 June 1988 to test a four-squadron organization. The test showed the wing needed a fifth squadron to provide operational support. On 1 September 1989, ATC activated the 100th Flying Training Squadron.

In 1991 Congress approved the second round of base closures, as identified by the Base Realignment and Closure Commission. On that list was Williams. The base was to cease operation as of 30 September 1993.  With Williams scheduled to close, ATC decided to move part of that base's T-38 fleet to Sheppard Air Force Base during 1992.

HQ USAF redesignated the 82nd Flying Training Wing as the 82nd Training Wing and assigned the designation to Air Education and Training Command on 1 July 1993. The 82nd was inactivated at Williams and HQ AETC activated the 82nd Training Wing at Sheppard and assigned it to Second Air Force. The 82nd's new mission was to conduct ground technical training.  The 82nd also became the host unit at Sheppard.

The 782nd Training Group was activated on 23 March 1994 and assigned it to the 82nd Training Wing. At the same time, the 396th Technical Training Group changed its name to the 82nd Training Group, the 82nd Medical Group became the 882nd Training Group, and the 82nd Field Training Group became the 982nd Training Group.  On 30 March, the wing began providing mission ready technician training, first in the C-141 crew chief course and, a day later, in the F-16 crew chief course. The C-141 program graduated its first class in August, followed in September by the F-16 class.

Lineage
 Established as the 82nd Fighter Wing on 28 July 1947
 Organized on 15 August 1947
 Inactivated on 2 October 1949
 Redesignated 82nd Flying Training Wing on 22 June 1972
 Activated on 1 February 1973
 Inactivated on 31 March 1993
 Redesignated 82nd Training Wing and activated on 1 July 1993

Assignments
 Strategic Air Command, 15 August 1947 (attached to 307th Bombardment Wing)
 Fifteenth Air Force, 16 December 1948
 First Air Force, 22 August – 2 October 1949
 Air Training Command, 1 February 1973 – 31 March 1993
 Second Air Force, 1 July 1993 – present

Components
Groups
 82nd Airdrome Group (later 82nd Air Base Group, 82nd Support Group, 82nd Mission Support Group): 15 August 1947 – 2 October 1949, 1 February 1973 – 31 March 1993, 1 June 1993 – present
 82nd Field Training Group (later 982nd Training Group): 1 June 1993 –  present
 82nd Fighter Group (later 82nd Operations Group): 15 August 1947 – 2 October 1949 (detached 4–29 April June 1948), 15 December 1991 – 31 March 1993
 82nd Maintenance & Supply Group (later 82nd Logistics Group): 15 August 1947 – 2 October 1949, 15 December 1991 – 31 March 1993, 1 July 1993 – 1 August 2002
 82nd Medical Training Group (later 882nd Training Group): 1 June 1993 – 15 September 2011
 82 Station Medical Group (later 82nd Medical Group, 82nd Flying Training Wing Clinic, 82nd Medical Squadron, 82nd Medical Group): 15 August 1947 – 2 October 1949, 1988 – 31 March 1993, 1 June 1993 – present
 82nd Technical Training Group (later 82nd Training Group): c. 1 June 1993 – present
 782nd Training Group: c. 1 July 1994 – present
 882nd Training Group (see 82nd Medical Training Group)
 982nd Training Group (see 82nd Field Training Group)

Squadrons
 82nd Comptroller Squadron: 1 June 1993 – present
 82nd Field Maintenance Squadron, 1 February 1973 – 3 April 1990
 82nd Medical Squadron (see 82nd Station Medical Group)
 82nd Organizational Maintenance Squadron, 1 February 1973 – c. 3 April 1990
 96th Flying Training Squadron: 1 February 1973 – 15 December 1991
 97th Flying Training Squadron: 1 February 1973 – 15 December 1991
 98th Flying Training Squadron: 1 June 1988 – 15 December 1991
 99th Flying Training Squadron: 1 June 1988 – 15 December 1991
 100th Flying Training Squadron: 1 September 1989 – 15 December 1991

 Other
 USAF Hospital, Williams: 15 October 1970 – 1988 (consolidated with 82nd Station Medical Group)
 82nd Flying Training Wing Clinic (see 82nd Station Medical Group)

Stations
 Grenier Field (later Grenier Air Force Base)], New Hampshire, 15 August 1947 – 2 October 1949
 Williams Air Force Base, Arizona, 1 February 1973 – 31 March 1993
 Sheppard Air Force Base, Texas, 1 July 1993 – present

Aircraft operated
 North American P-51 Mustang (later F-51) (1947–1949)
 Cessna T-37 Tweet (1973–1992)
 Northrop T-38 Talon (1973–1993)

Notes

Bibliography

Further reading

External links
Sheppard AFB Home Page

0082
Air force technical training units and formations
Military units and formations in Texas
Military units and formations established in 1947